D'Cinnamons is an Indonesian unplugged-acoustic band established in September 2004. The band consists of three members, two female and one male: Dodo (lead vocal and rhythms), Bona (lead guitar and vocal), and Nana (acoustic bass and vocal). Their debut album, Good Morning, was released in early 2007 with their first single, “Loving You”.

Group history 
Started as a cafe band, in 2004 D'Cinnamons played acoustic versions of most Top 40 songs in their hometown Bandung. Then In 2007 they decided to release their own songs on their debut album Good Morning. They reach popularity among Indonesian after they released the singles Selamanya Cinta in late 2007 as a soundtrack of the movie Cintapuccino. It won the most favorite soundtrack of the year in Indonesian Movie Award 2008.

After huge success they released singles Galih dan Ratna in 2009, Damai Tapi Gersang in 2010.

Their latest album Atlantis released in February 2012. it is produced by Suwardi Widjaja and Directed by Andi Riyanto.

Discography

Discography

External links
 D'Cinnamons Official Website

Indonesian pop music groups